Sergei Alexandrovich Senyuskin() (15 September 1957, Syzran, Samara Oblast, Russia - 29 February 1992, Khojaly, Azerbaijan) was a National Hero of Azerbaijan and warrior during the First Nagorno-Karabakh War.

Early life and education 
Senyuskin was born on 15 September 1957 in Syzran, Samara Oblast, Russia. In 1974, he completed his secondary education at Syzran city secondary school. Senyuskin entered Polytechnic Institute in Syzran, and later in 1975 he continued his education at the Higher Military Aircraft School. In 1979, he successfully completed his education.

Personal life 
Senyuskin was married and had two children.

First Nagorno-Karabakh War 
Senyuskin moved to Azerbaijan and devoted the rest of his live to this country. He was appointed the commander of one of the military units in Azerbaijan.  Senyuskin is considered to be one of the creators of the Azerbaijani Air Force and also involved in many military operations in Nagorno-Karabakh.

On February 26, 1992, when the Armenians committed crimes in Khojaly Khojaly, Senyuskin helped town inhabitants to evacuate from the city and initially died in a battle with Armenian soldiers on February 29, 1992.

Honors 
Sergei Alexandrovich Senyuskin was posthumously awarded the title of the "National Hero of Azerbaijan" by Presidential Decree No. 204 dated 14 September 1992.

He was buried at a cemetery in Syzran, Samara Oblast, Russia. A street in Baku was named after him.

See also 
 First Nagorno-Karabakh War
 List of National Heroes of Azerbaijan

References

Sources 
Vugar Asgarov. Azərbaycanın Milli Qəhrəmanları (Yenidən işlənmiş II nəşr). Bakı: "Dərələyəz-M", 2010, səh. 255.

1957 births
1992 deaths
Azerbaijani military personnel
Azerbaijani military personnel of the Nagorno-Karabakh War
Azerbaijani military personnel killed in action
National Heroes of Azerbaijan
People from Syzran